Torodo is a village and seat of the commune of Diédougou in the Cercle of Kati in the Koulikoro Region of south-western Mali. The village is 60 km northwest of Bamako, the Malian capital.

References

Populated places in Koulikoro Region